The Musical is a 2011 South Korean television series starring Koo Hye-sun, Choi Daniel, Park Ki-woong, Ock Joo-hyun and Kim Eun-se. It aired on SBS from September 2 to December 23, 2011 on Fridays at 22:00 for 15 episodes.

Filming began in July 2010, and the series was pre-produced before airing. One of the location shoots took place in Broadway, New York City.

Synopsis
The series follows the lives of people in the world of musical theatre, showing the passion and dreams among the producers, songwriters and actors during a musical production. Go Eun-bi is a medical student who loves musicals, and her dream is to be a professional musical theatre actress. Hong Jae-yi was once one of the best composers in Korea, but he quit musical theatre and left the country after his girlfriend, musical theatre diva Bae Kang-hee broke up with him and married another man. When Jae-yi returns to Korea, he accidentally meets Eun-bi and decides to help her achieve her dream. Jae-yi believes that Eun-bi will become a better actress than Kang-hee, and thus their love triangle begins.

Cast

Main cast
Koo Hye-sun as Go Eun-bi  
Choi Daniel as Hong Jae-yi
Park Ki-woong as Yoo Jin
Ock Joo-hyun as Bae Kang-hee
Kim Eun-se as Seo Ra-kyung

Supporting cast
Park Kyung-lim as Sa Bok-ja
Kim Hyun-sung as Han Sang-won
Oh Jung-se as Goo-jak
Kim Yong-min as Joon-hyuk
Kim In-seo as Sang-mi
Lee Do-kyung as Eun-bi's father
Jung Young-sook as Yang Soon-yi
Kang Ji-hoo as Hyun Kwang-seo
Cha Kwang-soo as Yoo Jin-young
Ahn Yeo-jin as Sun-hee
Park Geun-hyung as President Yoo
Jo Won-hee 
Lee Ji-hyung as Yoo Jae-joon
Kim Jin-ho as President Seo
Choo So-young
Jung Tae 
Seo Bum-suk
Hong Ji-min (cameo)
Jo Ji-hoon (cameo)

International broadcast 
The series' broadcast rights were sold to Japan ahead of its premiere in South Korea, where it aired on cable channel KNTV.

References

External links 
The Musical official SBS website 

Seoul Broadcasting System television dramas
2011 South Korean television series debuts
2011 South Korean television series endings
Korean-language television shows
South Korean pre-produced television series
South Korean musical television series